The Rositsa is a river in central northern Bulgaria, the most important tributary (a left one) of the Yantra. Its ancient name was Lyginus.

The river has its source in the Central Balkan Mountains between Shipka Pass to the east and Botev Peak to the west and flows north until Sevlievo, after which it gradually turns east-northeast until emptying into the Yantra. There is a dam on the river some  after Sevlievo, Aleksandar Stamboliyski Dam.

An important tributary is the Vidima, which flows into the Rositsa at Sevlievo. Other tributaries include the Negoychevitsa, the Kravenishka, the Byala and the Bagareshtitsa from the left, as well as the Malobuhalshtitsa, the Zelenikovets and the Marishtnitsa from the right.

References

Rivers of Bulgaria
Landforms of Ruse Province
Landforms of Plovdiv Province
Landforms of Gabrovo Province
Landforms of Stara Zagora Province